The 1995 Moscow Ladies Open doubles was a tennis tournament played on indoor carpet courts at the Olympic Stadium in Moscow in Russia that was part of 1995 Moscow Ladies Open. The tournament was held from September 18 through September 23, 1995.

Elena Makarova and Eugenia Maniokova were the defending champions but lost in the first round to Anna Kournikova and Aleksandra Olsza.

Meredith McGrath and Larisa Savchenko won in the final 6–1, 6–0 against Kournikova and Olsza.

Seeds
Champion seeds are indicated in bold text while text in italics indicates the round in which those seeds were eliminated.

 Meredith McGrath /  Larisa Savchenko (champions)
 Elena Makarova /  Eugenia Maniokova (first round)
 Maria Lindström /  Maria Strandlund (semifinals)
 Laurence Courtois /  Nancy Feber (first round)

Draw

External links
 1995 Moscow Ladies Open Doubles Draw

1995 WTA Tour
Mosc
1995 in Russian tennis